The Serbian Party Oathkeepers (SSZ) is a far-right political party in Serbia.

The party's previous name was Serbian Movement Oathkeepers. The party defines itself as a conservative and Russophilic political party and it opposes membership to European Union and NATO. It participated in the 2020 Serbian parliamentary election.

History 
They participated in the parliamentary election in 2014 under a coalition called "Patriotic Front" but the coalition only got 4,514 votes. They also participated in the parliamentary election that took in 2016 in which they got 27,690 votes. In October 2022, two MPs and two members of the City Assembly of Belgrade left the party and the SSZ parliamentary group due to their criticism of Đurđević Stamenkovski. They joined SNS in February 2023.

Political positions 

SSZ is positioned on the far-right on the political spectrum. It is an ultranationalist party, and it is staunchly socially conservative. It has been described as right-wing populist, and it is also opposed to illegal immigration. SSZ opposes the European Union and NATO, and it supports establishing closer ties with Russia.

Together with the People's Party, New Democratic Party of Serbia, and Dveri, it signed a joint declaration for the "reintegration of Kosovo into the constitutional and legal order of Serbia" in October 2022.

Electoral performance

Parliamentary elections

Presidential elections

Belgrade City Assembly elections

References

Conservative parties in Serbia
Eastern Orthodox political parties
Serb nationalist parties
Far-right parties in Europe
Far-right politics in Serbia
Nationalist parties in Serbia
Right-wing populism in Serbia
2012 establishments in Serbia
Eastern Orthodoxy and far-right politics
Right-wing populist parties
Anti-immigration politics in Europe
Political parties established in 2012
Social conservative parties
Russophilia